The 1951 Louisville Cardinals football team represented the University of Louisville in the 1951 college football season. Future NFL quarterback Johnny Unitas was in his freshman year on the team.

Schedule

Team players in the NFL

References

Louisville
Louisville Cardinals football seasons
Louisville Cardinals football